Dynan is a surname. Notable people with the surname include:

 Karen Dynan, American economist
 Phil Dynan (born 1948), American artist and author

See also
 Dinan (disambiguation)
 Dynon, surname